Evon Redmond is a Jamaican politician from the People's National Party. He was Member of Parliament for Saint Elizabeth North Eastern from 2016 to 2020.

References 

Living people
Year of birth missing (living people)
Place of birth missing (living people)
People's National Party (Jamaica) politicians

Members of the 13th Parliament of Jamaica
21st-century Jamaican politicians
People from Saint Elizabeth Parish